Peter Nix (born 25 January 1958 in Rotherham) is an English former footballer who played for Rotherham United and Penrith City. Peter's son, Kyle Nix, is also a footballer and currently plays in the Thai Premier League for Chiangrai United F.C.

References

1958 births
Living people
Footballers from Rotherham
English footballers
Association football midfielders
Rotherham United F.C. players
English Football League players
National Soccer League (Australia) players